Adam Mesh (born September 14, 1975) is an American entrepreneur, stock trader, television personality and author. He is the CEO and founder of The Adam Mesh Trading Group. Adam Mesh was first introduced to television audiences in the 2003 NBC show Average Joe. Mesh starred in the spin-off The Average Joe - Adam Returns.

YOLO 

Mesh launched the You Only Live Once (YOLO) clothing line on March 20, 2004. 

Mesh helped popularize the acronym YOLO.

The Adam Mesh Trading Group 
The Adam Mesh Trading Group distribute a daily newsletter, products and a stock-trade coaching program. He also wrote a book entitled The Average Joe's Ultimate Beginner's Guide to the Stock Market. The book details The Adam Mesh Trading Group's mission: discipline, control and accountability.

Mesh has been featured in Fortune magazine, he was the Stock Market Personality of the Month in Consumer Reports and appeared on various national television shows including ABC's Good Money, CNBC's Squawk Box, Fox Business, NBC's Today Show, The Tonight Show with Jay Leno, The Ellen DeGeneres Show, Regis and Kelly, ABC News, and Anderson Cooper 360.

Personal life 
Mesh is a graduate of Marlboro High School in Marlboro Township, New Jersey. Mesh was a graduate of the University of Michigan in 1997.

Mesh married Jessica Malca on May 28, 2006 in Miami, Florida.

References

External links
realitytvworld.com profile

1975 births
Living people
Male actors from New Jersey
Marlboro High School alumni
Participants in American reality television series
People from Marlboro Township, New Jersey
University of Michigan alumni
American chief executives of financial services companies